NFON AG is a provider of cloud-based PBX for business communication. Its headquarters are in Munich. NFON was founded in 2007 and is represented in 15 countries with subsidiaries and a partner network in Europe. The company is the only pan-European provider of cloud PBX. Due to the growing demand for digital communications within corporate structures and remote work, NFON offers services that reflect the general shift towards modern collaborative practices.

History 
NFON was founded in 2007 by Marcus Otto, Mathias Edelmann and Fabian Hoppe. At the beginning of 2021, the company had more than 40,000 customers, over 500,000 extensions installed at customer' premises, and more than 2,700 partners. In 2019 and 2020, NFON posted revenue growth of 32% and has since become a partner for many companies enabling digital business communications through cloud telephony.

Two years after its founding, NFON launched its first cloud-based PBX. With Ncontactcenter and Neorecording, the product portfolio was expanded in 2016. In 2018, the cloud PBX Cloudya was introduced, which today is NFON's core product.

At the beginning of 2019, NFON acquired the company Deutsche Telefon Standard GmbH, and, at the end of 2019, Onwerk GmbH.

Corporate philosophy 
With the claim "NFON, the new freedom of business communication", the company positions itself at the heart of the zeitgeist of the digitalized working world. The company has four guiding principles: to create flexible communication structures within companies, to enable independence of location, and to offer products that integrate intuitively

Financial figures 
In May 2018, NFON went public on the Frankfurt Stock Exchange (Prime Standard listing). In the 2019 financial year, the company generated revenues of 57.1 million euros. This represented an increase of 32.7% in overall revenues compared to the previous year. The value of its shares has increased by around 44% since the IPO.

Other areas of activity 
NFON supports initiatives such as Enactus, an independent organization dedicated to solving social and environmental problems. NFON is also involved with Climate Partners.

Awards 
 2017	 Focus Wachstum Champion (“Growth Champion”)
 2017	 FT 1000: Europe’s Fastest Growing Companies
 2017	 Frost & Sullivan Growth Excellence Leadership Award
 2019 Tagesschau: “Product of the Year” for NFON Cloudya
 2019 FOX Finance Visuals
 2019 FOX Finance Visuals 
 2020	 Frost & Sullivan Radar 10 Growth and Innovation Leaders

References 

VoIP companies of Germany
Companies based in Munich